The Port of New Orleans is an embarkation port for cruise passengers. It is also Louisiana’s only international container port.

The port generates $100 million in revenue annually through its four lines of business – cargo (46%), rail (31%), cruise (16%), and industrial real estate (7%). As a self-sustaining political subdivision of the State of Louisiana, it receives zero tax dollars.

In 1946, a foreign-trade zone was established in the port. The New Orleans FTZ has more individual warehouses and sites under its umbrella than any other U.S. port-administered FTZ.

Location

The port is located on the Mississippi River about 100 miles upriver from the Gulf of Mexico. It is a diverse general cargo port, handling containerized cargo such as plastic resins, food products, consumer merchandise; and breakbulk cargo such as steel, metals, rubber, wood, and paper.

Facility investment and terminal operations
State, port, and private companies have invested nearly $1 billion in infrastructure and facilities at New orleans, and another billion of investment is planned with private partnerships.

Containerized Cargo 
The Port of New Orleans is the only deepwater container port in Louisiana. It has an annual capacity of 840,000 TEU, with six gantry cranes to handle 10,000 TEU vessels. Four new 100-foot gauge gantry cranes were ordered spring/summer 2019 and are under construction. There are regular container-on-barge services and on-dock rail access with the Mississippi River Intermodal Terminal. The New Orleans Public Belt Railroad provides the port, partners and shippers with an on-dock intermodal advantage.

Breakbulk Capabilities
There are 13,511 feet of berthing space available at six dedicated breakbulk terminals, along with 1.6 million square feet of transit shed area for the temporary storage of breakbulk cargo, and the ability to discharge directly to/from barge. 140,000-square-foot dockside cold storage facility is available at the Henry Clay Avenue Refrigerated Terminal.

Cruise terminal facilities
New Orleans is the sixth largest cruise port in the United States. In 2019, it had 1.20 million cruise passenger movements and 251 cruise vessel calls.

 

Carnival and Norwegian sail weekly to destinations in the Eastern and Western Caribbean and Bahamas. Disney Cruise Line sails six cruises in 2020 from New Orleans. Royal Caribbean International returns with the Enchantment of the Seas in 2020 as well. Riverine cruises are a growing sector at Port NOLA. American Queen Steamboat Company and American Cruise Lines offer cruises along the coast and the nation’s inland river system.

Governance
The Board of Commissioners of the Port of New Orleans governs the port. The Board sets policies and regulates traffic and commerce.  It is made up of seven unsalaried commissioners who serve five-year staggered terms. The governor of Louisiana appoints board members from a list of three nominees submitted by 19 local business, civic, labor, education, and maritime groups.  The seven-person board reflects its three-parish (county) jurisdiction.  Four members are selected from Orleans Parish, two from Jefferson Parish, and one from St. Bernard Parish.

Board members
 Darryl D. Berger – Chairman
 William H. Langenstein – Vice-Chairman
 Charles H. Ponstein  – Secretary- Treasurer
 Tara C. Hernandez - Member 
 Jack C. Jensen Jr.  – Member 
 Joseph F. Toomy - Member
 Walter J. Leger Jr. - Member

Executive management

Brandy D. Christian – President and CEO
 Anthony Evett - Chief Engineer and VP, Planning and Facilities
Michelle Ganon -VP, Public Affairs
Todd Rives - VP, Chief Commercial Officer
Ronald Wendel - CAO/CFO and VP, Finance and Administration
Jean-Paul Escudier - Executive Counsel
Bobby Landry - Outgoing VP, Chief Commercial Officer

See also
 United States container ports

References

New Orleans, Port of
Transportation in New Orleans
Economy of New Orleans
River ports of the United States